Gene Pritsker (born 1971) is a Russian-born composer, guitarist, rapper and record producer living in New York City. He moved to the United States with his family in 1978 and lived in Sheepshead Bay, Brooklyn. He attended the Manhattan School of Music from 1990 to 1994 where he studied composition with Giampaolo Bracali.

While attending Manhattan School of Music he co-founded the Absolute Ensemble with Kristjan Järvi and formed Sound Liberation, which has released CDs on Col-legno, Composers Concordance Records and Innova Recordings. Pritsker's music has been performed by the Adelaide Symphony Orchestra, MDR Symphony Orchestra, Athens Camarata, Brooklyn Philharmonic and the Berlin Philharmonic. He worked closely with the Austrian-American jazz keyboardist and composer Joe Zawinul and has orchestrated Hollywood movies.

His compositions are published by Falls House Press, Gold Branch Music, Periferia Sheet Music and Calabrese Brothers Music, LLC.

His compositions and performances can be heard on Col Legno, Enja Records, Eutrepe, Wergo, Innova Recordings, Composers' Concordance Records, and Capstone Records labels. He is a member of Broadcast Music, Inc.

Reception
Pritsker contributed to Absolute Bach Reinvented, a collection of works based on Johann Sebastian Bach's keyboard inventions. His "Bach-derived framework" was always evident in his Reinventions as he played an "art-metal guitar solo" that included "flamboyant tango rhythms."

Pritsker's 2006 composition, Self Laceration, was positively reviewed in The New York Times, which noted that it "begins with a rhythmically insistent, irresistibly zesty movement in which the focus moves briskly around the ensemble."

Another 2006 citation in The New York Times, by Brian Wise, cited Pritsker's Cauldron of Unsatisfied Hatred as the "highlight of the evening" and referred to the piece as a "pulsating duet". Wise went on to say, "Mr. Pritsker expressed skepticism about whether a deep connection could be drawn between music and pugilism."

During a performance of Terry Riley's In C at Governors Island, The New York Times noted, "Probably no one had more fun than the guitarist Gene Pritsker."

In 2012 he released the chamber opera William James's Varieties of Religious Experience with Composers Concordance Recordings. In a review for NewMusicBox, Frank J. Oteri described its blurring of boundaries as "the only possible reaction to being surrounded by all of these sounds and the musical styles from which they [composers] originate."

Compositions – selected
Samplestra is pre-recorded electronics (as in an orchestra of samples, notated in score format.)

Solo
Modified #4 (2012) for clarinet and samplestra or triggered samplestra – composed for Marianne Gythfeld
Deep Time (2009) for multiple percussion solo – composed for Peter Jarvis
A 21st Century Reconstruction of J. S. Bach (2005) for bass trombone and samplestra – composed for David Taylor
'Sorrow, Like Pleasure, Creates Its Own Atmosphere' for flute and samplestra – composed for Margaret Lancaster
'Mysterious Restlessness' for clarinet and samplestra – composed for Michiyo Suzuki
'Electrically Tragic' for electric bassoon and samplestra – composed for Martin Kuuskmaan
'Never found Again' for solo cello and drone – composed for David Gotay
'Ta-Ka-Ki-Ga-Wa' for solo piano – composed for Taka Kigawa
Scars, Wounds, & Lacerations + Snow to numb the Effect (4 Guitar Pieces) – composed for Greg Baker
She's so chaconne (violin)
Picasso's Blues (piano)
Time Here Becomes Space II (piano)
What Occurred in the Light, Goes on in the Dark (solo cello)
Dead Souls (solo guitar)
Modified #1 (French horn and samplestra) for John Clark
Modified #2 (electric guitar and samplestra)
Modified #3 (bassoon and samplestra)
Kandinsky's Improvisations (piano and samplestra) for Kai Schumacher
Never Found Again (solo cello and drone) for David Gotay

Chamber
Russian Evenings Suite for violin and piano – composed for Lara St. John
'Variations on Sakura, sakura'  for violin and piano – composed for Anne Akiko Meyers
Recycle (2012) for soprano, baritone, electric guitar, double bass and percussion – composed for Composers Concordance Ensemble
Herky-Jerky (2012) for chamber ensemble – composed for Composers Concordance Ensemble
Roundelay (2011) electric guitar and drum set – composed for the Jarvis/Pritsker Duo

Chamber orchestra
Songs So Wild and Wayward (2012) for chamber orchestra – composed for the Composers Concordance Chamber Orchestra
40 Changing Orbits (2012) for chamber orchestra – composed for the Absolute Ensemble

Concertos
Songs so Wild and Wayward (2012) for solo violin and chamber orchestra – composed for Lara St. John
Incantation (2011) for solo violin and chamber orchestra – composed for Miltiades Papastamou
'Reinventions' for piano and chamber orchestra – composed for Simone Dinnerstein
Flammenschrift A Fanfare for the Natives of this Earth (orchestra)
Variations on Sakura, Sakura II (orchestra)

Orchestra
Cloud Atlas Symphony (2012) for full orchestra – composed for the MDR Symphony Orchestra 
40 Changing Orbits (chamber orchestra) 
3 Poems from Flowers of Evil (chorus, chamber orchestra, Di.J.) – composed for the Absolute Ensemble and the Latvian State Choir
Pretty maidens slam dancing (full orchestra) – composed for the Manhattan Composers Orchestra 
Massacre, 20th century style (full orchestra)  – composed for the Absolute Ensemble
I'm afraid you might ask for my soul (full orchestra)
Animals (chamber orchestra, narrator)
PUNK (string orchestra)
All I want now is to look at life (string orchestra and trumpet)
Destined (chamber orchestra and samplestra)
Hologram Spiritual (string orchestra)

Operas
William James' Varieties of Religious Experience (2009) – libretto by Gene Pritsker
Money (2007) – libretto by Gene Pritsker
Manhattan in Charcoal (chamber opera) – libretto by Jacob Miller
De Maupassant's Cheaters (chamber opera) – libretto by Gene Pritsker
The Tell-Tale Heart (chamber opera) – libretto by Gene Pritsker
The Devil and Superman (chamber opera) – libretto by Gene Pritsker
Nietzsche the Madman (chamber opera) – libretto by Gene Pritsker

Discography – selected
Solo-Duo-Trio-Quartet-Quintet: Chamber Electronic Music of Gene Pritsker performed by Sweet Plantain String Quartet (Artist), International Street Cannibals. Composers Concordance Records #comcon003
Manhattan in Charcoal a chamber opera with libretto/poetry by Jacob Miller – Concordance Records #comcon021
William James's Varieties of Religious Experience: a chamber opera by Gene Pritsker performed by – Sound Liberation. Concordance Records #comcon07
'Samplestra' released on Composers Concordance Records, focusing on electro – acoustic compositions
'Melodies Alone Can Proudly Carry Their Own Death' released on Composers Concordance Records, focusing on Chamber music
'Eclectic Music eXtravaganza (EMX)' released on Composers Concordance Records, focusing on Chamber music
'‘Operatic Electric' with Countertenor Juecheng Chenreleased on Composers Concordance Records, focusing on electronic music
'Maggots and other Chamber music of Gene Pritsker' released on Composers Concordance Records, focusing on Chamber music
'Eroicanization' with ensemble KONTRASTreleased on Composers Concordance Records, Di.J. Concerto 
'Cloud Atlas Symphony' with Kristjan Jarvi - conductor
MDR Leipzig Radio Symphony, NEscapes Records
Sound Liberation' albums: 'Days' (CCR), 'Open Up Your Ears and Get Some' (Col Legno),  'VRE Suite' (Innova), 'Sound Liberation' (self release), ‘Rite Through an Eclectic Spectrum’(CCR), 'Let's Save The World Suite' (CCR)

Film DVDs – selected
2012: Cloud Atlas  
Pritsker was invited to orchestrate and compose additional music for the screenplay adaption of the novel Cloud Atlas by David Mitchell. The screenplay was written by Lana Wachowski, Tom Tykwer and Andy Wachowski.

2021: The Matrix Resurrections''  
Pritsker is the supervising orchestrater and composed additional music for the 2021 Lana Wachwoski film 'The Matrix Resurrections'.

Bibliography
Pritsker, Gene (2014): Composing Cloud Atlas Symphony. In: Stoppe, Sebastian (ed.), Film in Concert: Film Scores and their Relation to Classical Concert Music, pp. 145–160. .
Pritsker, Gene (2014): On Film Music in the 21st Century. In: Stoppe, Sebastian (ed.), Film in Concert: Film Scores and their Relation to Classical Concert Music, pp. 125–130. .

References

Living people
1971 births
Russian musicians
21st-century classical composers